The fourth season of Queer as Folk, an American and Canadian television series, consisted of fourteen episodes and premiered on Showtime on April 18, 2004, in the United States and on Showcase on April 19, 2004, in Canada.

Cast

Main cast
 Gale Harold as Brian Kinney
 Randy Harrison as Justin Taylor
 Hal Sparks as Michael Novotny
 Peter Paige as Emmett Honeycutt
 Scott Lowell as Ted Schmidt
 Thea Gill as Lindsay Peterson
 Michelle Clunie as Melanie Marcus
 Robert Gant as Ben Bruckner
 Sharon Gless as Debbie Novotny
 Jack Wetherall as Vic Grassi

Supporting cast
 Harris Allan as James "Hunter" Montgomery
 Sherry Miller as Jennifer Taylor
 Matt Battaglia as Drew Boyd
 Makyla Smith as Daphne Chanders
 Peter MacNeill as Carl Horvath
 Carlo Rota as Gardner Vance
 Robin Thomas as Sam Auerbach
 Mitch Morris as Cody Bell
 Meredith Henderson as Callie Leeson
Mike Shara as Brett Keller
 Dean Armstrong as Blake Wyzecki
 Stephanie Moore as Cynthia

Episodes

References

2004 American television seasons
2004 Canadian television seasons
Queer as Folk